is a passenger railway station located in the town of Matsuno-chō, Kitauwa District, Ehime Prefecture, Japan. It is operated by JR Shikoku and has the station number "G38".

Lines

Layout
The station consists of a side platform serving a single track. The station facilities are operated on a kan'i itaku basis by the Matsuno-chō Interaction Centre (a municipal community centre) which provides a waiting room and an information/ticket window. Other civic facilities are co-located in the building including an onsen on the second level. Parking is available outside.

Adjacent stations

|-
!colspan=5|JR Shikoku

History
With the nationalization of Uwajima Railway on 1 August 1933, the station came under the control of Japanese Government Railways (JGR), later corporatised as Japan National Railways (JNR). With the privatization of JNR on 1 April 1987, control passed to JR Shikoku.

Surrounding area
Matsuno - the station is located in the town centre, just off the main shopping street. The town office and local post office are located about 250 metres away.  
Shimanto River - runs next to the station track.
National Route 381 - runs parallel to the track across the river.
Morinokunipoppo Hot Spring - an onsen located on level two of the station building.

See also
 List of railway stations in Japan

References

External links
Station timetable

Railway stations in Ehime Prefecture
Yodo Line
Railway stations in Japan opened in 1923
Matsuno, Ehime